Parkhi Union is a union of Kalihati Upazila, Tangail District, Bangladesh. It is situated 19 km north of Tangail, The District Headquarter.

Demographics

According to Population Census 2011 performed by Bangladesh Bureau of Statistics, The total population of Parkhi union is 19164. There are 4622 households in total.

Education

The literacy rate of Parkhi Union is 44.5% (Male-47.8%, Female-41.6%).

References

Populated places in Dhaka Division
Populated places in Tangail District
Unions of Kalihati Upazila